Campbell Cooley is an American voice and television actor based in New Zealand, best known for voicing prominent villains in the Power Rangers franchise.

Biography

Early life
He attended the University of Louisville where he received a Bachelor of Fine Arts degree in Theatre. For several years he worked as a stage actor and director.

Acting career
In 1997, he moved into acting for film and television. In 1998 (during a four-month period), he played three different villainous roles on Xena: Warrior Princess. One of the roles gave him the distinction of being victim to Gabrielle (Renee O'Connor) in the "infamous Drool scene", is named by Xena fans, from the episode, In Sickness and In Hell.

In 2005 he appeared in New Zealand's medical soap opera Shortland Street as nurse 'Liam Todd', caregiver to Dr. Chris Warner's twin sister, Amanda Warner (Marissa Stott).

In 2007 he got his first major role in the Power Rangers franchise, the new voice of Alpha 6 in the Operation Overdrive episode “Once a Ranger”. He would go on to voice Admiral Malkor in Power Rangers Megaforce, Snide in Power Rangers Dino Super Charge, Galaxy Warriors host Cosmo Royale and Ripcon in Power Rangers Ninja Steel and Super Ninja Steel and Scrozzle in Power Rangers Beast Morphers. He would later voice new general Slyther in Power Rangers Dino Fury.

References

External links
 

1966 births
Living people
American expatriate male actors in New Zealand
American male voice actors
Male actors from Florida
People from Pensacola, Florida
University of Louisville alumni